Boyat or Bayat may refer to:
Boyat, Aghjabadi, Azerbaijan
Boyat, Neftchala, Azerbaijan
Boyat, Shamakhi, Azerbaijan
Boyat, Ujar, Azerbaijan

See also
Bayat (disambiguation)